The 1959 Soviet Chess Championship was the 26th edition of USSR Chess Championship. Held from 9 January to 11 February 1959 in Tbilisi. The tournament was won by Tigran Petrosian. The final were preceded by semifinals events at Baku, Moscow, Rostov and Tashkent.

Table and results

References 

USSR Chess Championships
Championship
Chess
1959 in chess
Chess